Hakkı Metin Günay (born 26 January 1963) is a Turkish director. His most well-known works are Deli Yürek (1998), Ekmek Teknesi (2002) and Diriliş: Ertuğrul (2014). He graduated from the Yıldız Technical University and has directed 12 series so far along with some films. Whereas, Günay also starred as an actor in a TV series.

Filmography

Awards and nominations

References

External links 
 
 

Living people
People from Isparta Province
1963 births
Yıldız_Technical_University_alumni